Rangiyam is a village in the Udayarpalayam taluk of Ariyalur district, Tamil Nadu, India.

Demographics 

As per the 2001 census, Rangiyam had a total population of 1727 with 845 males and 882 females.

References 

Villages in Ariyalur district